The 1964–65 Primeira Divisão was the 31st season of top-tier football in Portugal.

Overview
It was contested by 14 teams, and S.L. Benfica won the championship.

League standings

Results

References

External links
 Portugal 1964-65 - RSSSF (Jorge Miguel Teixeira)
 Portuguese League 1964/65 - footballzz.co.uk
 Portugal - Table of Honor - Soccer Library

Primeira Liga seasons
1964–65 in Portuguese football
Portugal